The British Journal of Clinical Psychology is a medical journal published by Wiley-Blackwell on behalf of the British Psychological Society covering topics in clinical psychology. It was established in 1981, when the British Journal of Social and Clinical Psychology split in two parts, the other being British Journal of Social Psychology. The editor-in-chief is Jessica Grisham (University of New South Wales). According to the Journal Citation Reports, the journal has a 2018 impact factor of 2.672, ranking it 38th out of 130 journals in the category "Psychology, Clinical".

References

External links 
 

Quarterly journals
English-language journals
Publications established in 1981
Abnormal psychology journals
Clinical psychology journals
British Psychological Society academic journals
Psychotherapy journals